The third season of Tawag ng Tanghalan was an amateur singing competition currently aired as a segment of the noontime show It's Showtime from June 25, 2018, to September 28, 2019.

Hosts and judges
Rey Valera returned as the head coach for the third season, with Gary Valenciano, Louie Ocampo, Jaya, Ogie Alcasid, Yeng Constantino serving as fill-in for Valera. Judges Karylle, Karla Estrada, K Brosas, Nyoy Volante, Mitoy Yonting, Erik Santos, Kyla, Jed Madela and Jolina Magdangal returned as judges for the third season. OPM Legends Dulce, Randy Santiago and Zsa Zsa Padilla (March 11, 2019 – present) were added to the panel of judges this season. Dulce also serves as the head judge in some episodes.

Vhong Navarro, Anne Curtis, Amy Perez-Castillo, and Vice Ganda reprised their roles as hosts for the third season, with Ryan Bang, Jhong Hilario, Teddy Corpuz, and Jugs Jugueta serving as co-hosts as well as the Gong. Mariel Rodriguez-Padilla returned to fulfill her hosting duties this season.

Kim Chiu, Maja Salvador, Robi Domingo, Bela Padilla and Billy Crawford served as guest hosts in the absence of the main hosts.

Season changes
Coinciding with the third year of TNT, the show unveiled three new changes in the competition.

Updated judging criteria
The judging criteria has been updated to further improve the quality of the competition itself. It will only be based on two criterion standards alone: Voice Quality (50%) and Overall Performance (50%). The first criterion includes Intonation, Enunciation, Voice Projection, and Technique. On the other hand, Timing, Mastery of Lyrics, Stage Presence, and Audience Impact comprise the second criterion.

Tawag ng Tahanan
Starting June 29, 2018, this segment will be for the lucky home viewer who will correctly predict the winner in the face-off round between the Daily Winner and Defending Champion. The viewers must be able to call the designated number flashed on-screen for a chance to win ₱5,000. It will be done every day. The segment was conceptualized due to the high public participation last season in social media.

Judge's Instant Resbak

This season, every judge will now have the power to return a losing Defending Champion from the Face-off Round using the Instant Resbak. The contestant who is given this power will then be saved and moves on to the Instant Resbak Week for a slot in the rounds of the week-long Grand Finals which also known as "Ang Huling Tapatan". However, each judge is only entitled one save per season only (For example, if the judge uses his/her power in Quarter I, he/she can't use it again in the succeeding Quarters).

Daily Rounds

Quarter I

Quarter II

Quarter III

Quarter IV

Semifinals 
The semifinals will take place at the end of the each quarter which will determine the two grand finalists that will take place in 2019. The two grand finalists will receive a medal and an additional 150,000 cash, while the remaining contenders will receive additional 25,000. The score will be composed of 50% coming from the judges and 50% from the text and/or online votes. A semi-finalist may be "gonged" during this stage and be eliminated from the competition.

Summary of Semifinalists 
Contender's Information

Results Details

Semifinal Results 
Color Key:

Quarter I Results 
The first quarter of the contest covered the months from June to September. The week-long showdown took place on October 1–6, 2018.

Ranillo Enriquez (Visayas) and Elaine Duran (Mindanao) were declared as the first two grand finalists.

Quarter II Results 
The second quarter of the contest covered the months from October 2018 to January 2019. The week-long showdown took place on January 21–26, 2019.

 Group Performance: ("What's Up?")

John Mark Saga (Luzon) and John Michael dela Cerna (Mindanao) were announced as the 3rd and 4th grand finalists.

Quarter III Results 
The third quarter of the contest covered the months from February to March. The week-long showdown took place on April 1–6, 2019.

 Group Performance: ("April Boy Regino Medley"), with guest performer, April Boy Regino

Charizze Arnigo (Mindanao) and Jonas Oñate (Visayas) were announced as the 5th and 6th grand finalists.

Quarter IV Results 
The fourth and final quarter of the contest covered the months originally from April to June later from April to August. The week-long showdown originally took place on June 24–29, 2019 later reschedule on August 26–31, 2019.

Violeta Bayawa (Mindanao) and Julius Cawaling (Luzon) were announced as the 7th and 8th grand finalists.

Instant Resbak 

This season, every judge will now have the power to return a losing Defending Champion from the Face-off Round using the Instant Resbak. The contestant who is given this power will then be saved and moves on to the Instant Resbak Week for a chance to participate in the rounds of the week-long grand finals (Ang Huling Tapatan). However, each judge is only entitled one save per season only (For example, if the judge uses his/her power in Quarter I, he/she can't use it again in the succeeding Quarters). Billy Crawford, Karla Estrada and Dulce did not award their Instant Resbak flags throughout the season.

The Instant Resbak Round follows the mechanics below:

 For the judges, they are not allowed to join the panel in the days that their contender will participate. They will personally coach their hand-picked contenders and watch them during the performance.
 Four contenders will face each day and two will be selected by the non-participating judges to advance to the next round.
 The top two will select one song from three songs prepared. The higher scorer will perform first. The winner will be decided by the average public and judge's score to advance to the final day.

The Instant Resbak week aired on September 2–6, 2019.

Summary of Instant Resbakers 
Color Key:

Results Details:

Instant Resbak Details

Daily Rounds (September 2–5, 2019)

Final Day (September 6, 2019) 

Shaina Mae Allaga (Mindanao) and Rafaello Cañedo (Mindanao) were announced as the 9th and 10th grand finalists.

Instant Resbak flag 
Dulce, Karla Estrada and Billy Crawford did not use their flags to someone throughout the daily rounds. They have an opportunity to select two contenders each to advance for the Ultimate Resbak.

Ultimate Resbak
Losing semifinalists who are not gonged, and Instant Resbakers saved by the judges after the results, may still go forward to the week-long Grand Finals dubbed as "Ang Huling Tapatan" through the Ultimate Resbak Week as wildcards.

All 16 Contenders will pick their songs and performed to get two slots for the Seat of Power who earned the Highest Text Votes and Judges Scores, and It will aired on the YouTube Channel of It's Showtime Online September 6, 2019, 6:00 PM.

The Ultimate Resbak started immediately after the final day of Instant Resbak Round, aired from September 7 to 14, 2019.

It uses the same format as the second season, where it follows a last man standing format.

Before the aired episodes, the semifinalists were pitted against each other to claim one of the two Seat of Powers. The Seat of Powers serves as immunity against the other contenders and gives them opportunity to select two semifinalists to pit against each other. The two contenders garnering the highest combined score from the public and judges will claim the Seat of Power. In the case where the judge's choice and the public's choice are the same person, the second placing contender for the public's choice will become the public's choice.

In the aired episodes, the two semifinalists who are in the Seat of Power picks one semifinalist each. The picked semifinalists will be pitted against each other for a chance to dethrone the semifinalists in the Seat of Powers. The winner of the first round is selected by the majority of the judges. The winner will now challenge one of the semifinalists in the Seat of Powers to go in a sing-off. The winner is based on 50% public vote and 50% judges' score. If the challenger wins, he/she dethrones the seated semifinalist. If the seated semifinalist wins, she/he remains in the Seat of Power. The remaining contenders in the Seat of Power will move forward to the week long Grand-Finals dubbed as "Ang Huling Tapatan" while the other contenders are eliminated.

Emil Sinagpulo (Luzon, Quarter II), Rose Ganda Sanz (Luzon, Quarter II), Marco Adobas (Metro Manila, Quarter III), Alliyah Cadeliña (Metro Manila, Quarter IV) and Shantal Cuizon (Luzon, Quarter IV) chose not to compete for the Ultimate Resbak due to their other priorities.

Summary of Ultimate Resbakers
Color Key:

Results Details:

*Inclusive of bonus prizes

Seat of Power Round 
Color Key and Details:

Ultimate Resbak Week 
Color Key:

Jermaine Apil (Luzon) and Mariko Ledesma (Luzon) were announced as the 11th and 12th grand finalists.

Final Resbak 
Due to the popularity of the Instant and Ultimate Resbak Rounds, the show added another phase, dubbed as Final Resbak. This will open one more slot for the Grand Finals, dubbed as "Ang Huling Tapatan".

It follows the mechanics below:

 The resbakers were pitted against each other to claim the only Seat of Power. The Seat of Power serves as immunity against the other contenders. The contender garnering the highest combined score from the public will claim the Seat of Power. 
 In the aired episodes, the resbaker who is in the Seat of Power picks three resbaker. The picked resbaker will be pitted against each other for a chance to dethrone the resbaker in the Seat of Power. The winner of the first round is selected by the majority of the judges. 
 The winner will now challenge the resbaker in the Seat of Power to go in a sing-off. The winner is based on 50% public vote and 50% judges' score. If the challenger wins, he/she dethrones the seated resbaker. If the seated resbaker wins, she/he remains in the Seat of Power. 
 The remaining contender in the Seat of Power will move forward to the week long Grand-Finals dubbed as "Ang Huling Tapatan" while the other contenders are eliminated.

Mariane Osabel from Mindanao withdrew to participate from the competition due to health problems.

Summary of Final Resbakers

Final Seat of Power Round 
Color Key and Details:

Final Resbak Round 
Color Key:

Kim Nemenzo (Visayas) was announced as the 13th grand finalist (now 12th grand finalist).

Ang Huling Tapatan (Grand Finals) 
After the Ultimate Resbak round, the week-long Grand Finals, dubbed as "Ang Huling Tapatan" (The Final Face-off), was originally scheduled from September 16–21 but was rescheduled to September 23–28, 2019, due to the addition of the new phase of the competition, the Final Resbak. It is the same as the previous season, but with modified results, used by voting percentages. The 13 finalists (now 12) from the 4 quarters and the resbak rounds will now compete for the title Grand Champion. This is the first grand finals of the regular version without a finalist from Metro Manila, and the first one that with one contender withdrew.

Mariko Ledesma from Luzon withdrew to participate from the competition due to her personal reasons.

Summary of Grand Finalists 
Color Key:

Results Details

*Inclusive of bonus prizes

Daily Rounds (September 23–27, 2019) 
Results Details:

Round 1 (September 23 and 24) 
Note: This is a two-day episode of this round. The results will be announced on Tuesday, September 24.

Theme: Homecoming Song

Round 2 (September 25) 

Theme: Fight Song

Round 3 (September 26) 

Theme: Fast and Groovy Song

Round 4 (September 27) 

Theme: Now or Never Song

Live Finale (September 28, 2019) 

Results Details:

Top 6 

Theme: Journey Song

Final 3 

Theme: Medley Songs

Elaine Duran from Mindanao emerged as the Grand Champion, followed by John Mark Saga as the second placer and John Michael dela Cerna as the third placer.

Guest Performances

Elimination table 
Color Key:

Results Details

 Prize won only indicate their recent victor, not their cumulative prize won in the entirety of the season. (Example: If a contender returns as a resbaker, their prize won is reverted to zero)

Tawag ng Tanghalan (TNT) Record Holder 
Defending champions who manages to make 10 straight wins is now a record holder and has the opportunity to select a bonus prize.

Notable contestants 
Tawag ng Tanghalan Seasons 1, 2, and Kids (incomplete)
 
 John Mark Digamon appeared on Season 1 as a daily contender. He appeared again for Season 2 and became a four-time defending champion before continuing his streak for Season 3.
 Mary Grace Lor, Epigil Moleje, Jeffrey Dela Torre, Janine Pialan, Crismille Vallente, Ken Mariscal, Mayleah Gom-os, Ramoncito Ricafrente, Yanna Delos Reyes, Zaira Mae Alquizalas, Behnaz Denani, Gerlyn Abaño, Arnel Nadonza, Ruben Tejano, Jun Barcela, Marvin Melgar, Noreen Gamos, Claire Anne Yongco, Mariel Panillon, Marianne Rivera, Marilou Brual, Ferli Joy Oyao, Jestonie Divino, Jannine Cartagena, Erlindo Son, Queenie Joy Ocampos, Reymar Mejares and Germi Angel Salcon appeared in Season 1
 Aizel Ruga, Mara Santos, James Matthew Alfafara, Pinky Mari, Jhanewin Melo, Tom Cesar Vergara, Gwen Rea Nacionales, JM Joven, Marlou Flores, Prolifer Fesalbon, Krisna Gold Bawiin, Rodel Montecillo, Julius Cawaling, Romel Colao, Raymundo Alvarez, Evelyn Cinco, Kristel Budomo, Jelu Sarilla, Alki Dignos, Jennifer Ariate, Yessamin Temperatura, Honey Roche, Ariel Campungan, Daryl Coloma, Klarisse Claro, Dan Kristofer Ferrer, Janine Lauron, Ferlyn Suela and Paolo Marquez appeared in Season 2.
 Jehramae Trangia appeared twice in Season 2. On her first appearance, she dethroned semifinalist Aila Santos and became a defending champion for a day before being dethroned by Lalainne Clarisse Araña. On her second appearance, she dethroned semifinalist Douglas Dagal in season 2 and became a defending champion for three days before she was dethroned by Mau Marcelo.
 John Mark Saga was a semifinalist in Season 2 but lost in the semifinal round. He did not participate in the Ultimate Resbak round. He holds the record for having the most days of being a defending champion (15 days).
 Shaina Mae Allaga was a semifinalist in Tawag ng Tanghalan Kids but lost in the third round.
 Dominador Alviola, Jr. was a semifinalist in Season 1 but lost in the semifinal round. He participated in the Ultimate Resbak round but lost in the final round.
 
The Voice of the Philippines / The Voice Kids / The Voice Teens
 
 Romel Colao appeared on the first season of The Voice of the Philippines, but did not receive a chair turn in the auditions.
 Sir Lord Lumibao appeared on the first season of The Voice of the Philippines, joining Team apl.de.ap. He was eliminated in the battles
 Kevin Ibañez appeared in the second season of The Voice of the Philippines, but did not receive a chair turn in the auditions.
 Karl Aris Tanhueco appeared in the second season of The Voice of the Philippines, joining Team Lea. He was eliminated in the Battles.
 Isaac Zamudio appeared on the first season of the Voice Kids, received three-chair turns and joined Team Sarah. He was eliminated in the Battle Rounds to Lyca Gairanod.
Emil Sinagpulo appeared in the second season of The Voice of the Philippines, joining Team Lea. He was eliminated in the Battles.
 Don Wilson Mojado appeared on the first season of the Voice Kids, but did not receive a chair turn in the auditions.
 Nisha Bedaña appeared on the first season of the Voice Teens, gained three-chair turns and joined Team Sarah. She was eliminated in the Live Semifinals to Jona Marie Soquite.
 Alessandra Galvez appeared on the first season of the Voice Teens, gained two-chair turns and joined Team Sharon. She was eliminated in the first night of Live Shows.
 
I Can See Your Voice
 
 John Andrew Manzano was selected by Vice Ganda as the winner of I Can See Your Voice.
Manuel Macapugay, Jr. was selected by Claire dela Fuente as the winner of I Can See Your Voice.
Kyran Oliver was selected by Salbakutah as the winner of I Can See Your Voice.
JM Santos was selected by Bea Alonzo as the winner of I Can See Your Voice.
Jenelyn Refulgente was selected by Gloc-9 as the winner of I Can See Your Voice.
Ernesto Paredes was selected by Yassi Pressman and Sam Concepcion as the winner of I Can See Your Voice.
 
Pilipinas Got Talent
 
 Rowell Quizon appeared on the third season of Pilipinas Got Talent. He lost the judges' votes in the semifinals.
 
ASAP Natin 'To
 
 Yong Yting appeared on the show's new segment where viral online sensations are featured to perform with ASAP's main performers.
 Richard Estanes appeared on the show's new segment where viral online sensations are featured to perform with ASAP's main performers with guest performer, April Boy Regino
 Roy Limcaoco appeared on the show's new segment where viral online sensations are featured to perform with ASAP's main performers
Jemril Martin appeared as a part of the band, Jammer's Session on the show's new segment where viral online sensations are featured to perform with ASAP's main performers.
John Gonzaga appeared as part of the band, Jammer's Session on the show's new segment where viral online sensations are featured to perform with ASAP's main performers.

References
Notes

Scores

Sources

External links
 Tawag ng Tanghalan

Tawag ng Tanghalan seasons
2018 Philippine television seasons
2019 Philippine television seasons